The University of Wisconsin–Madison College of Engineering, often referred to as COE, is the engineering school of the University of Wisconsin–Madison. The college comprises 13 academic departments.

The school dates back to 1857 when the first department of engineering was created by the university Board of Regents. It was not until 1868 when the first professor of engineering, Colonel W. R. Pease, was hired.

U.S. News & World Report ranks UW–Madison ranked 13th among engineering programs nationwide, fourth in chemical engineering, and third in nuclear engineering.

Academic departments
Biomedical Engineering (BME)
Chemical and Biological Engineering (CBE)
Civil and Environmental Engineering (CEE)
Geological Engineering (GLE)
Electrical and Computer Engineering (ECE)
Nuclear Engineering & Engineering Physics (NEEP)
Engineering Mechanics (EM)
Engineering Professional Development (EPD)
Industrial and Systems Engineering (ISyE)
InterEngineering (INTEREGR)
Materials Science and Engineering (MS&E)
Mechanical Engineering (ME)
Biological Systems Engineering (BSE)

Notes

College of Engineering
Engineering schools and colleges in the United States
Engineering universities and colleges in Wisconsin
Educational institutions established in 1857
1857 establishments in Wisconsin